Erik Pochanski (born 5 April 1992) is a Bulgarian footballer who plays as a midfielder.

Career

Early career
Pochanski started his career in Chavdar Etropole in 2010 and moved to Montana in 2013. In June 2015 Pochanski signed a pre-contract with Dunav Ruse, but latеly the same month moved to Ludogorets Razgrad II. In the beginning of 2016 he moved to another B Group team Lokomotiv GO.

Beroe 
On 10 June 2016 Pochanski moved to Beroe Stara Zagora. He made his debut for the team on 31 June 2016 in a match for Europa League First qualifying round against FK Radnik Bijeljina. On 7 July he scored  both goals for a 2:0 win which qualified Beroe to a further round.

On 18 July 2017, Pochanski's contract was terminated by mutual consent.

Etar 
On 20 July 2017, Pochanski signed with Etar Veliko Tarnovo.

Career statistics

Club

References

External links
 
 

Living people
1992 births
Bulgarian footballers
Bulgaria youth international footballers
Bulgaria under-21 international footballers
FC Chavdar Etropole players
FC Montana players
FC Lokomotiv Gorna Oryahovitsa players
PFC Beroe Stara Zagora players
SFC Etar Veliko Tarnovo players
PFC Ludogorets Razgrad II players
Neftochimic Burgas players
PFC Dobrudzha Dobrich players
First Professional Football League (Bulgaria) players
Second Professional Football League (Bulgaria) players
Association football midfielders